Chato's Land is a 1972 Western Technicolor film directed by Michael Winner, starring Charles Bronson and Jack Palance.

In Apache country, the half-native Chato shoots the local sheriff in self-defense, and finds himself hunted by a posse of ex-Confederates, who rape his wife and leave her hogtied in the open as a bait to trap him. After freeing her, Chato uses his superior fieldcraft skills to lure each of the posse to their deaths.

The film can be classified in the revisionist Western genre, which was at its height at the time, with a dramatizing of racism and oblique referencing of the Vietnam War. The original screenplay was written by Gerry Wilson.

Plot
The half-Apache Chato is racially abused in a bar by the sheriff. He shoots the sheriff dead in self-defense and rides out of town on his Paso Fino. Former Confederate Captain Quincey Whitmore dons his uniform and gathers a posse of former Confederate soldiers and sympathizers. Chato, staying one step ahead, fires on the posse from a hilltop drawing them into a difficult ascent while he descends the other side and scatters their horses. He kills a rattlesnake and wraps the rattle in the snake's skin. Tensions begin to create divisions within the posse. They come across a set of empty wickiups and gleefully burn them.

Chato greets his wife at their hogan and gives his son the rattlesnake toy he fashioned earlier. Chato resumes his life breaking horses during the day. The posse discovers his home, and Elias, Earl, Hall and Lansing brutally gang rape Chato's wife, and then hogtie her naked outside the hogan as bait to lead Chato into a trap. Chato devises a plan with his full Apache kinsman, who creates a diversion allowing Chato to rescue his wife. Chato's kinsman is wounded and the posse hang him upside down and burn him alive. Whitmore, disgusted, shoots the burning man in the head.

Chato abandons European dress and dons native moccasins and loin cloth. He lures the posse members into individual traps, starting with Earl Hooker, who is fixated on Chato's wife. Finding Earl's dead body staked out in the desert, the posse grows more fractious, and they begin to turn on each other. When two of the posse turn back, Elias kills one and chases the other, but both are killed by Chato. Jubal kills Whitmore when he objects, inciting the last two members of the posse, Malechie and Logan, to beat Jubal to death with rocks. Chato kills Malechie and allows Logan to flee without supplies, alone and horseless, deeper into Apache territory as Chato watches impassively from his horse.

Cast

 Charles Bronson as Pardon Chato
 Jack Palance as Captain Quincey Whitmore
 James Whitmore as Joshua Everette
 Simon Oakland as Jubal Hooker
 Richard Basehart as Nye Buell
 Ralph Waite as Elias Hooker
 Richard Jordan as Earl Hooker
 Victor French as Martin Hall
 Sonia Rangan as Chato's wife

 William Watson as Harvey Lansing
 Roddy McMillan as Gavin Malechie
 Paul Young as Brady Logan
 Lee Patterson as George Dunn
 Peter Dyneley as Ezra Meade
 Hugh McDermott as Bartender
 Raúl Castro as Mexican scout 
 Verna Harvey as Shelby Hooker

Production

Filming
The film was shot in Almeria, Spain, in 1971.

Music

Soundtrack
A CD of the film's soundtrack was released on January 15, 2008, by Intrada Records (Intrada Special Collection Vol. 58).

Track listing

 1. Titles - 4:41
 2. Peeping Tom in the Bushes - 0:44
 3. Mind Your Ma; Whiskey and Hot Sun - 1:29
 4. Coop Falls - 1:24
 5. Pain in the Water Bags; Burning Rancheros - 1 & 2 4:47
 6. Peeping Tom on the Ridge; First Stampede - 3:04
 7. Indian Convention - 1:35
 8. The Snake Bite - 1:21
 9. Chato Comes Home - 1:52
 10. Indian Rodeo; Chato Bags Horse - 2:21
 11. Junior Blows the Whistle - 0:42

 12. Fire and Stampede; Joan of Arc at Stake - 3:54
 13. Mr. & Mrs. Chato Split; Massas in the Cold, Cold Ground - 1:26
 14. Hot Pants - 2:46
 15. Rainbow on the Range - 0:58
 16. Ride Like Hell - 0:50
 17. Big Stare Job; Here-There-Everywhere - 2:19
 18. Attack in Gorge - 1:53
 19. One Big Pain in the Neck - 2:35
 20. Lansing Scalped - 1:46
 21. Elias Gets the Snake; Malechie Gets Shot; Finis - 5:06

Release

Home media
It was released on Region One DVD in 2001 and on Region Two in 2004.

Reception

Critical response
When released, Vincent Canby panned the film, calling it a "...long, idiotic revenge Western...It was directed by Michael Winner in some lovely landscapes near Almeria, Spain. Just about everybody gets shot or knifed, and one man dies after Chato lassos him with a live rattlesnake."

TV Guide, echoing Canby, wrote, "A great cast is primarily wasted in this gory, below-average, and overlong film. The script could have been written for a silent film to fit with Bronson's traditional man-of-few-words image (in fact, more grunts and squint than words)...As usual, Bronson must rely upon the conviction that there are viewers who find silence eloquent."

A more recent Film4 review was more positive, observing that Chato's Land "...though no masterpiece, is an effective and frequently disturbing piece of filmmaking. A tough, cynical Western with well-paced direction and a fine performance from Charles Bronson and the cast of vagabonds out to get him. A quality film from Michael Winner."

1970s political overtones
Film critic Graeme Clark discussed a political theme of the film when it was released in the early 1970s, writing, "There are those who view this film as an allegory of the United States' presence in Vietnam, which was contemporary to this storyline, but perhaps that is giving the filmmakers too much credit. Granted, there is the theme of the white men intruding on a land where they are frequently under fire, and ending up humiliated as a result, but when this was made it was not entirely clear that America would be on the losing side as the conflict may have been winding down, but was by no means over."

Film4 is more assertive in their review, "The cruelty of the posse is well conveyed by an able (and supremely ugly) group of actors headed up by Jack Palance and Simon Oakland. Some of their acts, such as the brutal rape of Chato's wife and the burning of an Indian village, have an unpleasant edge which Winner does not shy away from. Parallels with the contemporary situation in Vietnam can't have been lost on the original audience.

See also
 List of American films of 1972

References

External links
 
 
 
 John Landis on Chato's Land at Trailers from Hell
 
 Chato's Land at The Spaghetti Western Database

1972 films
1972 Western (genre) films
American Western (genre) films
British Western (genre) films
1970s English-language films
Films about Native Americans
Films directed by Michael Winner
Films scored by Jerry Fielding
Films shot in Almería
United Artists films
Revisionist Western (genre) films
Films produced by Michael Winner
1970s American films
1970s British films